Joseph H. Kpandeba, CRSL (born December 30, 1960) is a Sierra Leonean politician and the current Minority Leader of Parliament of Sierra Leone. She is the leader of the main opposition Sierra Leone People's Party (SLPP) in the Sierra Leone House of Parliament. She currently represent Constituency 13 from Kenema District in the Sierra Leone House of Parliament.

In the 2002 general elections, Madam Lahai was elected to the Sierra Leone House of Parliament. She was re-election easily in the 2007 Parliamentary elections. She won another easy re-election in the 2012 Parliamentary elections, with 69.15%.

Lahai has a Bachelor of Arts in Geography and Sociology from Fourah Bay College, and a Master's Degree in Agricultural extension and Rural development from Njala University, both in Sierra Leone. Lahai also has a PhD in Agricultural extension and Rural development from the University of Reading in Berkshire, England.

Lahai is a native of Kenema District in Eastern Sierra Leone, and a member of the Mende ethnic group.

Early life and education
Lahai was born on December 30, 1960, in the village of Yomboma  in Lower Bambara Chiefdom, Kenema District in the Eastern Province of British Sierra Leone to Mende parents. Lahai started her schooling at the Independent Primary School in Tongo, Kenema District. She then proceeded to the Holy Rosary Secondary School in Pujehun, Pujehun District. After a successful 'O' Levels, she went for her advanced sixth form certificate at the Christ the King College in Bo.

In her mid-twenties, Lahai gained admission into the Fourah Bay College in Freetown, where she graduated with a Bachelor of Arts in Geography and Sociology. She was later re-admitted to Fourah College to pursue her Postgraduate diploma in Education to become a professional teacher. In her quest for knowledge, she proceeded to Njala University in Bo for a Master's Degree in Agricultural extension and Rural development. For her exemplary academic performance, it pleased the University authorities to appoint her as a research assistant at the Institute of Agricultural Research of the college in which capacity she diligently served for few years.

Thereafter, Lahai secured a four-year scholarship to the University of Reading in Berkshire, England to embark on a PhD program in Agricultural extension and Rural development. She returned home in 1998 to help in the development of Sierra Leone. This took the dynamic academic back to the Institute of Agricultural Research as a full-time lecturer with the Sierra Leone Vision 2025 Project.

Political career
In 2002, Lahai ran for one of Kenema District's seats in parliament as a member of the then ruling Sierra Leone People's Party (SLPP). She was elected, gaining over 60% of the vote in Kenema District. She again won re-election in the 2007 general elections.

30% (Women and Politics in Sierra Leone)
In 2012, Lahai appeared in the short film 30% (Women and Politics in Sierra Leone) commissioned by Pathways for Women's Empowerment and Screen South. The film was made by Anna Cady and Jenny Cuff. It explores the unique challenges to gender equality in Sierra Leone, including corruption, violence and the foundational patriarchy of secret societies such as the Poro Society.

The film depicts Lahai and fellow women's rights activists Barbara Bangura and Salamatu Kamara and their work on a 30% Quota bill they were submitting to parliament.

30% (Women and Politics in Sierra Leone) was an Official Selection for the Sundance Film Festival 2013

In 2014, Lahai was recognized for her distinguished and dedicated service to the state in the fields of agriculture and politics by the President Ernest Bai Koroma who made her a Commander of the Order of the Republic (CRSL).

References

External links

https://web.archive.org/web/20080614133635/http://news.sl/drwebsite/publish/article_20058805.shtml

1960 births
Living people
Alumni of the University of Reading
Fourah Bay College alumni
Members of the Parliament of Sierra Leone
Mende people
Njala University alumni
Sierra Leonean feminists
Sierra Leone People's Party politicians
21st-century Sierra Leonean women politicians
21st-century Sierra Leonean politicians
Sierra Leone women's rights activists
People from Kenema District